was a renowned Japanese photographer active in the 1930s.

Notes

Japanese photographers